The 1570  occurred during Oda Nobunaga's struggle against the Asakura clan in Echizen province, which was allied with Azai Nagamasa.

Asakura Yoshikage, head of the Asakura clan was the regent of Ashikaga Yoshiaki, refused to come to Kyôto and attend a certain banquet, an act Nobunaga declared Asakura clan disloyal to both the shogun and the emperor. Nobunaga raised an army and marched on Echizen.

Kinoshita Hideyoshi, one of Nobunaga's chief generals, led the attack on the fortress of Kanegasaki held by Maeba Yoshitsugu. Azai Nagamasa, who had been Asakura's longtime ally, led an army to relief the Kanagasaki castle with the help of the Rokkaku clan and Ikkō-ikki. Nobunaga found himself surrounded by Azai-Asakura, Rokkaku and Ikkō-ikki forces. When defeat looked certain, Nobunaga successfully retreated from Kanagasaki castle. This act was the first mark of Nagamasa's betrayal of the Oda clan.

Aftermath
The fighting retreat at Kanegasaki enabled Nobunaga to once more cheat death, and to amass an army which would be victorious against the Azai-Asakura army at the Battle of Anegawa. Ikeda Katsumasa led 3,000 soldier and helped Nobunaga escape. Akechi Mitsuhide joined Hideyoshi to serve as the rear-guard for the departing forces. Hideyoshi's rear defense for his lord's escape is one of his fabled accomplishments under Nobunaga.

See also
Siege of Kanegasaki (1337)

References

Turnbull, Stephen (1998). 'The Samurai Sourcebook'. London: Cassell & Co.

Kanegasaki 1570
Kanegasaki 1570
1570 in Japan
Conflicts in 1570 
Azai clan